Johann Gustav Gottlieb Büsching (19 September 1783 – 4 May 1829) was a German antiquary. His knowledge of subjects pertaining to Germany in the Middle Ages was notable.

Biography
He was born in Berlin, the son of Anton Friedrich Büsching, a geographer and educator. He studied at the universities of Erlangen and Halle, was appointed royal archivist at Breslau in 1811, and in 1817 an associate professor of archaeology at the University of Breslau. He collected oral folk stories from the Uckermark region, which he published in Volks-Sagen, Märchen und Legenden (1812).

Selected works 
 Sammlung Deutscher Volkslieder mit einem Anhange Flammländischer u. Französischer, nebst Melodien (Collection of German folk songs with an appendix in Flemish and French, along with melodies; 1807).
 Deutsche Gedichte des Mittelalters (German poems of the Middle Ages; 3 parts, 1808–25).
 Volks-Sagen, Märchen und Legenden. Carl Heinrich Reclam, Leipzig 1812 (Folktales, fairy tales and legends).
 Der Deutschen Leben, Kunst und Wissen im Mittelalter (On German life, art and knowledge in the Middle Ages; 1818–19).

Translations 
Several of Büsching's  have been translated into English.

"" was rewritten in English for The Lady's Magazine in 1821 as "The History of Kibitz, the Peasant". This was followed by another adaptation in Popular Tales and Romances of the Northern Nations (1823) as "Kibitz", which was used as the basis of Jan M. Ziolkowski's more accurate translation in Fairy Tales from Before Fairy Tales (2007). Edgar Taylor translated this story for Grimm's Goblins (1876) as "Peewit", which was slightly revised by Marian Edwardes and included as "Pee-Wit" in Grimm's Household Tales (1912).

Taylor's Grimm's Goblins also included a translation of "" as "Cherry, or the Frog-Bride", which Edwardes revised as "Cherry the Frog-Bride" in Grimm's Household Tales. Andrew Lang also included a translation of the story as "Puddocky" in The Green Fairy Book (1892).

Thomas Roscoe translated "History of Count Walter and the Lady Helgunda" and "Assassination of the Empress of Tartary at Neumarkt in the Year 1240" in The German Novelists (1826).

Notes

References

External links

1783 births
1829 deaths
Writers from Berlin
People from the Margraviate of Brandenburg
19th-century German historians
German archivists
Academic staff of the University of Breslau
German male non-fiction writers